The Peruvian Yungas is a tropical and subtropical moist broadleaf forest ecoregion in the Yungas of Peru.

Setting
The Peruvian Yungas occur on the eastern slopes and valleys of the Peruvian Andes. They form a transition zone between the Southwest Amazon moist forests and Ucayali moist forests at lower elevations to the east and the Central Andean puna and wet puna at higher elevations to the west.

Climate
The climate in this ecoregion varies from a tropical rainforest climate in the north to a subtropical highland climate in the south.

Flora
This ecoregion contains over 3,000 species of plants, including 200 species of orchids. Orchid genera include Epidendrum and Maxillaria. Tree ferns (Cyathea) and bamboo (Chusquea) are common. Below , the forest includes species such as cedar (Cedrela), trumpet tree (Tabebuia), and relatives of papaya (Carica). Above , there are scrublands and wet rocky thickets with shrubs and land orchids as well as forests of Podocarpus conifers.

Fauna
This ecoregion contains over 200 species of vertebrates. The gallito de las rocas (Rupicola peruviana) is endemic.

Notable mammals include the shrew opossums (Caenolestes) and Kalinowski's Agouti (Dasyprocta kalinowskii), as well as the northern pudú (Pudu mephistophiles) and the hairy long-nosed armadillo (Dasypus pilosus).

Notable species with limited distributions found here include the horned curassow (Pauxi unicornis), hummingbirds (Metallura theresiae, Heliangelus regalis), the long-whiskered owlet (Xenoglaux loweryi) and the Marañón poison frog (Dendrobates mysteriosus).

Endangered and threatened species include the yellow-tailed woolly monkey (Oreonax flavicauda), jaguar (Panthera onca), ocelot (Leopardus pardalis), spectacled bear (Tremarctos ornatus), neotropical otter (Lontra longicaudis), colocolo (Oncifelis colocolo), Andean cock-of-the-rock (Rupicola peruviana) and cinchona (Cinchona sp.).

This ecoregions also has endemic species of butterflies from the genera Dismopha, Callithea, Paridos, and Morpho.

Natural areas
Bahuaja-Sonene National Park
Amarakaeri Communal Reserve
Megantoni National Sanctuary
Manú National Park
Otishi National Park
Nor Yauyos-Cochas Landscape Reserve
San Matías–San Carlos Protection Forest
Yanachaga–Chemillén National Park
Rio Abiseo National Park
Alto Mayo Protection Forest
Cutervo National Park
Historic Sanctuary of Machu Picchu

References

Yungas
Ecoregions of Peru

Forests of Peru
Ecoregions of the Andes
Neotropical tropical and subtropical moist broadleaf forests